Bordeaux-Saint-Clair is a commune in the Seine-Maritime department in the Normandy region in northern France.

Geography
The village is around 200 km away from Paris.

Heraldry

Population

Places of interest
 A 16th-century manorhouse and its park.
 Two churches, with parts dating from the 12th century

See also
Communes of the Seine-Maritime department

References

Communes of Seine-Maritime